mass mvmnt is a record label in Seattle, Washington. The Pacific Northwest-based mass mvmnt (pronounced mass movement) was formed in 2004 by a group of music producers and artists.

History
Though mass mvmnt's musical output is primarily electronic music with genres from dance music and glitchy 303 hip-hop to dub ambience and techno jazz, mass mvmnt is also associated with other work that parallels that endeavor such as: distribution, marketing, promotion & design.

Roster
 AMS + Mugfrosty
 Caro
 FCS North
 DJ Fucking in the Streets
 The Long Ranger
 Michael Sloan
 Mr. Piccolo
 Nongenetic
 Plastiq Phantom
 Ruede Hagelstein
 Riow Arai
 Scientific American

Discography
 (MM001) FCS North / Scientific American - fcssa
 (MM002) AMS + Mugfrosty - 2x4 mix
 (MM003)  AMS + Mugfrosty - USA VS Japan
 (MM004) Scientific American & Plastiq Phantom - Tubes
 (MM005) FCS North – Arc
 (MM006) DJ Fucking in the Streets
 (MM007) FCS North - Say Go
 (MM008) Time Promises Power -Tomorrow Grieves Today
 (MM009) Scientific American - Mass Dstrction
 (MM010) Mr. Piccolo - Learning to Share
 (MM011) VA - Proud to Swim Home: A Backporch Revolution Compilation for New Orleans.
 (MM012) FCS North - In The Fall
 (MM014) Scientific American - Saints Of Infinity / Simulated D.I.Y.
 (MM015) Riow Arai - DJ Mix

See also
 List of record labels

External links
 Official site

Record labels established in 2004
Electronic music record labels
Companies based in Seattle
American independent record labels
Electronic dance music record labels
Ambient music record labels